Allmendingen Castle is the name of several castles including:

Allmendingen Castle, Baden-Württemberg in Germany
Allmendingen Castle, Bern in Switzerland